Isabelle Dhordain (11 May 1959 – 21 February 2021) was a French Journalist.

Early life and education

Awards and honors
 In 2011, she was made a knight of Ordre des Arts et des Lettres.
 In 2016, she was made a knight of the Ordre national du Mérite.

References

1959 births
2021 deaths
French women journalists
Journalists from Paris
20th-century French journalists
21st-century French journalists
Place of death missing
French music critics
French women critics
20th-century French women
21st-century French women